Newer Wave 2.0 is a various artists compilation album released on September 29, 1998, by 21st Circuitry.

Reception

Aiding & Abetting gave Newer Wave, Vol. 2 a positive review and called the album "better than the first, both in song selection and in execution" and "it does rate highly in the fun factor". Keith Farley of AllMusic gave it a negative review, awarding the compilation one and a half out of five stars. In writing for Ink 19, the critic Eric Sanders praised the artists' re-imagining of the originals, writing, "The ideas are fresh and good, the material familiar and worth revisiting."

Track listing

Personnel
Adapted from the Newer Wave 2.0 liner notes.
 Mark27 – production and engineering (4)
 Rzr_Girl – cover art, design, vocals (4)
 The_Gun – vocals (4)
 Loretta Sterling – recording and mixing (3)
 Julian Tulip – vocals (12)
 Steve Watkins – production and engineering (12)

Release history

References

External links 
 Newer Wave 2.0 at Discogs (list of releases)

1998 compilation albums
Electronic body music compilation albums
Industrial rock compilation albums
21st Circuitry compilation albums